Abra, Burkina Faso is a village in the Bourzanga Department of Bam Province in northern Burkina Faso. It has a population of 884.

Notable people
 Ben Idrissa Dermé (1982-2016) was a Burkinabé international footballer

References

External links
Satellite map at Maplandia.com

Populated places in the Centre-Nord Region
Bam Province